Immigration and crime refers to the relationship between criminal activity and immigrant communities. Research suggests that people tend to overestimate the relationship between immigration and criminality, and that the media tends to erroneously depict immigrants as particularly crime-prone. The academic literature provides mixed findings for the relationship between immigration and crime worldwide, but finds for the United States that immigration either has no impact on the crime rate or that it reduces the crime rate. A meta-analysis of 51 studies from 1994–2014 on the relationship between immigration and crime in the United States found that overall immigration reduces crime, but the relationship is very weak.

The over-representation of immigrants in the criminal justice systems of several countries may be due to socioeconomic factors, imprisonment for migration offenses, and racial and ethnic discrimination by police and the judicial system. The relationship between immigration and terrorism is understudied, but existing research suggests that the relationship is weak and that repression of the immigrants increases the terror risk. Research on the relationship between refugee migration and crime is scarce, but existing empirical evidence fails to substantiate a relationship between refugee migration and crime.

Worldwide
Much of the empirical research on the causal relationship between immigration and crime has been limited due to weak instruments for determining causality. According to one economist writing in 2014, "while there have been many papers that document various correlations between immigrants and crime for a range of countries and time periods, most do not seriously address the issue of causality." The problem with causality primarily revolves around the location of immigrants being endogenous, which means that immigrants tend to disproportionately locate in deprived areas where crime is higher (because they cannot afford to stay in more expensive areas) or because they tend to locate in areas where there is a large population of residents of the same ethnic background. A burgeoning literature relying on strong instruments provides mixed findings. As one economist describes the existing literature in 2014, "most research for the US indicates that if any, this association is negative... while the results for Europe are mixed for property crime but no association is found for violent crime". Another economist writing in 2014 describes how "the evidence, based on empirical studies of many countries, indicates that there is no simple link between immigration and crime, but legalizing the status of immigrants has beneficial effects on crime rates." A 2009 review of the literature focusing on recent, high-quality studies from the United States found that immigration generally did not increase crime and often decreased it.

The relationship between crime and the legal status of immigrants remains understudied, but studies on amnesty programs in the United States and Italy suggest that legal status can largely explain the differences in crime between legal and illegal immigrants, most likely because legal status leads to greater job market opportunities for the immigrants. However, one study finds that the Immigration Reform and Control Act of 1986 led to an increase in crime among previously undocumented immigrants. Existing research suggests that labor market opportunities have a significant impact on immigrant crime rates. Young, male, and poorly-educated immigrants have the highest individual probabilities of imprisonment among immigrants. Research suggests that the allocation of immigrants to high crime neighborhoods increases individual immigrant crime propensity later in life due to social interaction with criminals.

Some factors may effect the reliability of data on suspect rates, crime rates, conviction rates and prison populations for drawing conclusions about immigrants’ overall involvement in criminal activity:
 Police practices, such as racial profiling, over-policing in areas populated by immigrants or in-group bias may result in disproportionately high numbers of immigrants among crime suspects.
 Possible discrimination by the judicial system may result in higher number of convictions.
 Unfavorable bail and sentencing decisions due to foreigners' ease of flight, lack of domiciles, lack of regular employment and lack of family able to host the individual can explain immigrants’ higher incarceration rates when compared to their share of convictions relative to the native population.
 Natives may be more likely to report crimes when they believe the offender has an immigrant background.
 Imprisonment for migration offenses, which are more common among immigrants, need to be taken account of for meaningful comparisons between overall immigrant and native criminal involvement.
 Foreigners imprisoned for drug offenses may not actually live in the country where they are serving sentences but were arrested while in transit.
Crimes by short-term migrants, such as tourists, exchange students and transient workers, are counted as crimes by immigrants or foreigners, and gives the impression that a higher share of the migrant population commits crimes (as these short-term migrants are not counted among the foreign-born population).
States with liberal refugee policies are less likely to experience civil conflict, as well as anti-refugee violence.

Terrorism 
The relationship between immigration and terrorism remains understudied, but the existing evidence provides little support for the notion that immigration unconditionally contributes to terrorism. A 2016 study finds that a higher level of migration is associated with a lower level of terrorism in the host country, but that migrants from terror-prone states do increase the risk of terrorism in the host country. The authors note though that "only a minority of migrants from high-terrorism states can be associated with increases in terrorism, and not necessarily in a direct way." In 2018, Washington and Lee University law professor Nora V. Demleitner wrote that there is "mixed evidence" as to a relationship between immigration and terrorism. A paper by a group of German political scientists and economists, covering 1980–2010, found that there were more terrorist attacks in countries with a larger number of foreigners, but that, on average, the foreigners were not more likely to become terrorists than the natives. The study also found little evidence that terrorism is systematically imported from predominantly Muslim countries. The same study found that compared to the average “non-terror-rich” country, migrants from Algeria, Iran, India, Spain, and Turkey were all more likely to be involved in a terrorist attack, while migrants from Angola and Cambodia were less likely than the reference groups to commit terror. The study found that repression of the migrants increased the terror risk. A 2019 study found no evidence of a relationship between immigration and terrorism. These findings held when specifically examining immigration from the Middle-East and North Africa and conflict-torn countries.

Research focusing on the security impact of the European migration crisis found little evidence that increasing migration flows corresponded to acts of terrorism. Statistical analysis by Jeffrey Treistman and Charles Gomez found that the "increase in migration did not correspond to an increase in the number of terrorist incidents in Europe."

According to Olivier Roy in 2017 analyzing the previous two decades of terrorism in France, the typical jihadist is a second-generation immigrant or convert who after a period of petty crime was radicalized in prison. Georgetown University terrorism expert Daniel Byman argues that repression of minority groups, such as Muslims, makes it easier for terrorist organizations to recruit from those minority groups. While French scholar Olivier Roy has argued that the burkini bans and secularist policies of France provoked religious violence in France, French scholar Gilles Kepel responded that Britain has no such policies and still suffered several jihadist attacks in 2017.

Asia

Japan 

A survey of existing research on immigration and crime in Japan found that "prosecution and sentencing in Japan do seem to result in some disparities by nationality, but the available data are too limited to arrive at confident conclusions about their nature or magnitude".

According to a 1997 news report, a large portion of crimes by immigrants are by Chinese in Japan, and some highly publicized crimes by organized groups of Chinese (often with help of Japanese organized crime) have led to a negative public perception of immigrants. According to the National Police Agency in 2015, Vietnamese nationals overtook Chinese as having the highest number of criminal offenses for foreigners. The number of offenses has reportedly been on the rise as of 2021, and has been linked to the lower economic status of Vietnamese in Japan.

Malaysia 
A 2017 study found that immigration to Malaysia decreases property crime rates and violent crime rates. In the case of property crime rates, this is in part because immigrants improve economic conditions for natives.

Europe

A 2015 study found that the increase in immigration flows into western European countries that took place in the 2000s did "not affect crime victimization, but it is associated with an increase in the fear of crime, the latter being consistently and positively correlated with the natives’ unfavourable attitude toward immigrants." In a survey of the existing economic literature on immigration and crime, one economist describes the existing literature in 2014 as showing that "the results for Europe are mixed for property crime but no association is found for violent crime".

Denmark

Immigrants who have committed crimes may be denied Danish citizenship. For instance, immigrants who have received a prison sentence of one year or more, or at least three months for crimes against a person cannot receive citizenship. Convictions which have resulted in a fine also carries with it a time period for immigrants, where citizenship applications are rejected up to 4.5 years after the fine. Upon several offences, the period is extended by 3 years. A report by Statistics Denmark released in December 2015 found that 83% of crimes are committed by individuals of Danish origin (88% of the total population), 14% by individuals of non-Western descent and 3% by those of non-Danish Western descent. An index standardized for age shows that crime rates are 48% higher among male immigrants and 140% higher among male descendants of immigrants.

Male Lebanese immigrants and their descendants, a big part of them being of Palestinian descent, have, at 257, the highest crime-index among the studied groups, which translates to crime rates 150%  higher than the country's average. The index is standardized by both age and socioeconomic status. Men of Yugoslav origin and men originating in Turkey, Pakistan, Somalia and Morocco are associated with high crime-indexes, ranging between 187 and 205, which translate to crime rates about double the country's average. A low index at 38 was recorded for immigrants from China.

A 2014 study of the random dispersal of refugee immigrants over the period 1986–1998, and focusing on the immigrant children who underwent this random assignment before the age of 15, suggests that exposure to neighbourhood crime increases individual crime propensity. The share of convicted criminals living in the assignment neighborhood at assignment affects later crime convictions of males, but not of females, who were assigned to these neighborhoods as children. The authors "find that a one standard deviation increase in the share of youth criminals living in the assignment neighborhood, and who committed a crime in the assignment year, increases the probability of a conviction for male assignees by between 5 percent and 9 percent later in life (when they are between 15 and 21 years old)."

One study of Denmark found that providing immigrants with voting rights reduced their crime rate.

At 4%, male migrants aged 15–64 with non-Western backgrounds had twice the conviction rate against the Danish Penal Code in 2018, compared to 2% for Danish men. In a given year, about 13% of all male descendants of non-Western migrants aged 17–24 are convicted against the penal code.

In November 2018, the government announced plans to house failed asylum claimants, criminal foreigners who could not be deported and foreign fighters in the Islamic State on Lindholm (Stege Bugt), an island no permanent residents. The scheme was approved by Danish parliament 19 December 2018. The plan was opposed by council leaders in Vordingsborg municipality and merchants in Kalvehave, where the ferry to Lindholm has its port.

A 2019 study reviewing ten studies on the relationship between immigration and crime in Denmark found that different studies came to different conclusions as to whether immigrants were overrepresented, depending on what kind of data was used.

In the 2018-2020 period, 83 people were denied Danish citizenship because they had committed serious crime. Among those were people who had received court sentences for gang crime, violence against children and sexual offenses. People who have received a prison sentence of at least one year are barred from receiving citizenship, along with people who have received a prison sentence of at least three months for a crime against a person.

In late 2020, the minister for Immigration and Integration, Mattias Tesfaye, announced that the category "Non-Western immigrant" in Danish statistics on immigrants was to be changed where immigrants with higher rates of crime and unemployment were to be placed into the MENAPT category encompassing immigrants from the Middle East, North Africa, Pakistan and Turkey. This was due to the "Non-Western" category encompassed major differences as integration of immigrants from Thailand, the Philippines and Latin America was markedly different from those of the Middle East. Of the about 500 thousand immigrants and second-generation immigrants in Denmark, 54.5 percent came from MENAPT countries. Statistics showed that young males from MENAPT countries had markedly higher crime rates than the corresponding group from other non-Western countries, where 4.6% had been sentenced for crimes while from other non-Western countries the rate was 1.8%.

In April 2021, the Mette Frederiksen Cabinet approved regulation which stops awarding citizenship to foreigners who had received a prison sentence in court which also encompassed suspended prison sentences. Previously, awarding citizenship was possible for foreigners with a prison sentence of less than a year.

Prison population 
In 2017, 30% of the prison population were foreign nationals with the largest group being Romanian citizens, followed by Turkish. and Lithuanian citizens. On 1 July 2017, there were 3403 inmates and 2382 of those were Danish citizens.

Finland

Immigrant crime in Finland became a topic of public debate in the 1990s-early 21st century period with the arrivals of Somalis in Finland.

A 2015 study found that immigrant youth had higher incidence rates in 14 out of 17 delinquent acts. The gap is small for thefts and vandalism, and no significant differences for shoplifting, bullying and use of intoxicants. According to the authors, "weak parental social control and risk routines, such as staying out late, appear to partly explain the immigrant youths’ higher delinquency", and "the relevance of socioeconomic factors was modest".

According to the American Bureau of Diplomatic Security, Estonians and Romanians were the two largest group of foreigners in Finnish prisons.

According to 2014 official statistics, 24% of rapes are estimated to have been committed by individuals with foreign surnames in Finland. For some context, foreign-language speakers and the foreign-born comprised roughly 6% of the Finnish population in 2014, meaning that the percentage of individuals with foreign surnames in Finland is at very least 6%. There are great differences in representation between nationalities of rapists: while in 1998 there were no rapists hailing from Vietnam or China, there were many from other countries; 10 times more "foreign-looking" men were accused of rape than the overall percentage of foreigners in Finland.

France

A 2006 study found "that the share of immigrants in the population has no significant impact on crime rates once immigrants’ economic circumstances are controlled for, while finding that unemployed immigrants tend to commit more crimes than unemployed non-immigrants." As shown in the 2006 study with 1999 French census data calculations, an unemployed nonimmigrant outlier raises the number of crimes by 0.297, and another raises it by 0.546. This demonstrates that in French society, very likely due to the anti-immigrant sentiments of the population and the struggles they face, unemployed immigrants are more likely to commit crimes than employed immigrants. 

Aoki and Yasuyuki’s research show that data that is frequently shown regarding French immigration and crime is misleading, as it does not take discrimination and economic hardships into account as a motivator for criminal acts. As shown in the 2006 study, after adding the share of unemployed immigrants in the labor force, it is determined that the effect of the share of immigrants now becomes insignificant. 

With the exception of 2015 in Macrotrends collection of data, French crime rates overall have been on the steady decline, experiencing a 5.68% decline from 2017-2018. However, immigration rates are on the incline, with a 10.74% increase of migrants granted asylum from 2017-2018. This data from 1990-2022 indicates that crime rates and migration rates do not correlate if one is only looking at the numbers, with no other qualitative factors in place.  

A study by sociologist Farhad Khosrokhavar, director of studies at the EHESS, found that "Muslims, mostly from North African origin, are becoming the most numerous group in [French prisons]." His work has been criticized for taking into account only 160 prisoners in 4 prisons, all close to northern Paris where most immigrants live.

Germany

Published in 2017, the first comprehensive study of the social effects of the one million refugees going to Germany found that it caused "very small increases in crime in particular with respect to drug offenses and fare-dodging." A 2021 study found that asylum seekers and recognized refugees had no impact on violent crime in Germany. A 2019 study by Otto von Guericke University Magdeburg economists found that the arrival of nearly one million refugees in 2015 did not increase the likelihood that Germans would be the victims of crime. A January 2018 Zurich University of Applied Sciences study commissioned by the German government attributed over 90% of a 10% overall rise in violent crime from to 2015 to 2016 in Lower Saxony to refugees. The study's authors noted that there were great differences between different refugee groups. Refugees from North African countries Algeria, Tunisia and Morocco constituted 0.9% of refugees but represented 17.1% of violent crime refugee suspects and 31% of robbery refugee suspects. The latter corresponds to a 35-fold over-representation. Refugees from Afghanistan, Syria and Iraq represented 54.7% of the total, but represented 16% of refugee robbery suspects and 34.9% violent crime suspects and were thus underrepresented.

A report released by the German Federal Office of Criminal Investigation in November 2015 found that over the period January–September 2015, the crime rate of refugees was the same as that of native Germans. According to Deutsche Welle, the report "concluded that the majority of crimes committed by refugees (67 percent) consisted of theft, robbery and fraud. Sex crimes made for less than 1 percent of all crimes committed by refugees, while homicide registered the smallest fraction at 0.1 percent." According to the conservative newspaper Die Welt's description of the report, the most common crime committed by refugees was not paying fares on public transportation. According to Deutsche Welle's reporting in February 2016 of a report by the German Federal Office of Criminal Investigation, the number of crimes committed by refugees did not rise in proportion to the number of refugees between 2014 and 2015. According to Deutsche Welle, "between 2014 and 2015, the number of crimes committed by refugees increased by 79 percent. Over the same period the number of refugees in Germany increased by 440 percent."

The U.S. fact-checker Politifact noted that Germany's crime data suggests that the crime rate of the average refugee is lower than that of the average German. In April 2017, the crime figures released for 2016 showed that the number of suspected crimes by refugees, asylum-seekers and illegal immigrants increased by 50 percent. The figures showed that most of the suspected crimes were by repeat offenders, and that 1 percent of migrants accounted for 40 percent of total migrant crimes.

A 2017 study in the European Economic Review found that the German government's policy of immigration of more than 3 million people of German descent to Germany after the collapse of the Soviet Union led to a significant increase in crime. The effects were strongest in regions with high unemployment, high preexisting crime levels or large shares of foreigners.

According to a 2017 study in the European Journal of Criminology, the crime rate was higher among immigrant youths than native youths during the 1990s and 2000s but most of the difference could be explained by socioeconomic factors. The different crime rates narrowed in the last ten years; the study speculates that "a new citizenship law finally granting German-born descendants of guest workers German citizenship, as well as increased integration efforts (particularly in schools) and a stronger disapproval of violence" may have contributed to this narrowing.

In 2018, the interior ministry's report "Criminality in context with immigration" (German: Kriminalität im Kontext von Zuwanderung)  for the first time summarized and singled out all people who entered Germany via the asylum system. The group called "immigrants" includes all asylum seekers, tolerated people, "unauthorized residents" and all those entitled to protection (subsidiary protected, contingent refugees and refugees under the Geneva Convention and asylum). The group represented roughly 2 percent of the German population by end of 2017, but was suspected of committing 8.5 percent of crimes (violations off the German alien law are not included). The numbers suggest that the differences could at least to some extent have to do with the fact that the refugees are younger and more often male than the average German. The statistics show that the asylum-group is highly overrepresented for some types of crime. They account for 14.3 percent of all suspects in crimes against life (which include murder, manslaughter and involuntary manslaughter), 12.2 percent of sexual offences, 11.4 percent of thefts and 9.7 percent of body injuries The report also shows differences between the origin of migrants. Syrians are underrepresented as suspects, whereas citizens from most African countries, especially northern Africans are strongly overrepresented. Afghans and Pakistanis are particularly overerrepresented in sexual offenses.

In February 2019, all states of Germany reported an increase in the share of foreign and stateless inmates in the Prisons in Germany in the preceding 3-5 year period. In Bremen and Hamburg half the inmates were foreigners and a third in North Rhine-Westphalia.

In 2018, the Wall Street Journal analysed German crime statistics for crime suspects and found that the  foreigners, overall 12.8% of the population, make up a disproportionate share of crime suspects (34.7%), see horizontal bar chart.

In 2017, as in previous years German citizens constituted the largest group of suspects in organised crime trials. The fraction of non-German citizen suspects increased from 67.5% to 70.7% while the fraction of German citizens decreased correspondingly. For the German citizens, 14.9% had a different citizenship at birth.

According to statistics collected by the German Federal Criminal Police Office (BKA), the number of immigrants suspects of sexual offenses in Germany has gone up in absolute numbers, while simultaneously the number of German perpetrators has gone down.

At least one immigrant was identified as a suspect in 3404 sexual offense cases in 2016, which were twice as many as the previous year.

The reduction was largely due to fewer illegal immigrants arriving or remaining in the country.

DW reported in 2006 that in Berlin, young male immigrants are three times more likely to commit violent crimes than their German peers. Hans-Jörg Albrecht, director of the Max Planck Institute for Foreign and International Criminal law in Freiburg, stated that the "one over-riding factor in youth crime [was] peer group pressure." Whereas the Gastarbeiter in the 50s and 60s did not have an elevated crime rate, second- and third-generation of immigrants had significantly higher crime rates.

Greece 

Illegal immigration to Greece has increased rapidly over the past several years. Tough immigration policies in Spain and Italy and agreements with their neighboring African countries to combat illegal immigration have changed the direction of African immigration flows toward Greece. At the same time, flows from Asia and the Middle East—mainly Pakistan, Afghanistan, Iraq, and Bangladesh—to Greece appear to have increased as well. By 2012 it was estimated that more than 1 million illegal immigrants entered Greece. The evidence now indicates that nearly all illegal immigration to the European Union flows through the country's porous borders. In 2010, 90 percent of all apprehensions for unauthorized entry into the European Union took place in Greece, compared to 75 percent in 2009 and 50 percent in 2008.

In 2010, 132,524 persons were arrested for "illegal entry or stay" in Greece, a sharp increase from 95,239 in 2006. Nearly half of those arrested (52,469) were immediately deported, the majority of them being Albanians. Official statistics show that immigrants are responsible for about half of the criminal activity in Greece.

Ireland 
Foreigners are under-represented in the Irish prison population, according to 2010 figures.

Italy 
According to the ISPI, the Italian prison population in 2018 counted  and of those 34% were foreigners, with the largest groups coming from Morocco, Albania, Romania, Tunisia and Nigeria.

A study of immigration to Italy during the period 1990–2003 found that "immigration increases only the incidence of robberies, while leaving unaffected all other types of crime. Since robberies represent a very minor fraction of all criminal offenses, the effect on the overall crime rate is not significantly different from zero." Over the period 2007–2016, the crime rate among foreigners decreased by around 65%.

A study of Italy before and after the January 2007 European Union enlargement found that giving legal status to the previously illegal immigrants from the new EU members states led to a "50 percent reduction in recidivism". The authors find that "legal status... explains one-half to two-thirds of the observed differences in crime rates between legal and illegal immigrants". A study on the 2007 so-called "click day" amnesty for undocumented immigrants in Italy found that the amnesty reduced the immigrant crime rate. The authors estimate "that a ten percent increase in the share of immigrants legalized in one region would imply a 0.3 percent reduction in immigrants’ criminal charges in the following year in that same region". Research shows that stricter enforcement of migration policy leads to a reduction in the crime rate of undocumented migrants.

According to the latest report by Idos/Unar, immigrants made up 32,6% of prison population in 2015 (four percentage points less than five years before), immigrants making up 8,2% of population in 2015. Prison population data may not give a reliable picture of immigrants' involvement in criminal activity due to different bail and sentencing decisions for foreigners. Foreigners are, for instance, far more overrepresented in the prison population than their share of convictions relative to the native population. According to a 2013 study, the majority of foreign prisoners are held in connection with a drug offence. One out of every nine offences ascribed to foreign prisoners concerns violation of ‘laws governing foreigners’. The 2013 study cites literature that points to discriminatory practices against foreigners by Italian law enforcement, judiciary and penal system.

According to a 2013 report, "undocumented immigrants are responsible for the vast majority of crimes committed in Italy by immigrants... the share of undocumented immigrants varies between 60 and 70 percent for violent crimes, and it increases to 70–85 for property crime. In 2009, the highest shares are in burglary (85), car theft (78), theft (76), robbery (75), assaulting public officer / resisting arrest (75), handling stolen goods (73)."

The 2013 report notes that "immigrants accounted for almost 23 percent of the criminal charges although they represented only 6‐7 percent of the resident population" in 2010.

According to 2007 data, the crime rate of legal immigrants was 1.2–1.4% whereas the crime rate was 0.8% for native Italians. The overrepresentation is partly due to the large number of young legal immigrants, the crime rate is 1.9% for legal immigrants aged 18–44 whereas it is 1.5% for their Italian peers; 0.4% for legal immigrants aged 45–64 years whereas it is 0.7% for their Italian peers; and for those over 65 years old, the crime rates is the same among natives and foreigners. 16.9% of crimes committed by legal immigrants aged 18–44 are linked to violations of immigration laws. By excluding those crimes, the crime rate of legal immigrants aged 18–44  is largely the same as that of same aged Italians.

Netherlands

"Allochtoon" Dutch youths, especially young Antillean and Surinamese Rotterdammers, are more often suspected of crime by the police than other youths.  More than half of Moroccan-Dutch male youths aged 18 to 24 years in Rotterdam have ever been suspected of crimes by the police, as compared to close to a quarter of native male youths. Among "native" youths aged from 18 to 24, 18% have been in contact with the judiciary.

According to a 2009 report commissioned by Justice Minister Ernst Hirsch Ballin, 63% of the 447 teenagers convicted of serious crime are children of parents born outside the Netherlands. All these cases concern crime for which the maximum jail sentence is longer than eight years, such as robbery with violence, extortion, arson, public acts of violence, sexual assault, manslaughter and murder. The ethnic composition of the perpetrators was: native Dutch – 37%; Moroccans – 14%; Unknown origin – 14%; "other non-Westerners" – 9%; Turkish – 8%; Surinamese – 7%; Antillean – 7%; and "other Westerners" – 4%.  In the majority of cases, the judges did not consider the serious offences to be grave enough to necessitate an unconditional jail sentence.

Analysis of police data for 2002 by ethnicity showed that 37.5 percent of all crime suspects living in the Netherlands were of foreign origin (including those of the second generation), almost twice as high as the share of immigrants in the Dutch population. The highest rates per capita were found among first and second generation male migrants of a non‐Western background. Of native male youths between the ages of 18 and 24, in 2002 2.2% were arrested, of all immigrant males of the same age 4.4%, of second generation non-Western males 6.4%. The crime rates for so‐called ‘Western migrants’ were very close to those of the native Dutch. In all groups, the rates for women were considerably lower than for men, lower than one percent, with the highest found among second generation non‐western migrants, 0.9% (Blom et al. 2005: 31).

For Moroccan immigrants, whether they originate from the underdeveloped parts of Morocco has a modest impact on their crime rate. One study finds that "crime rates in the Netherlands are higher among Moroccans who come from the countryside and the Rif, or whose parents do, than among those who come from the urban provinces in Morocco and from outside the Rif, or whose parents do." In 2015, individuals with a Moroccan background were, not taking their age into account, almost six times as likely to be suspected for a crime compared to the native Dutch. Of the first generation 2.52% was suspected of a crime, of the second generation 7.36%, of males 7.78% and women 1.34%.

Using 2015 data, Statistics Netherlands concluded that non-Western male immigrant youths had been relatively often suspected of a crime: 5.42% in the group aged between 18 and 24, compared with 1.92% for native Dutch of the same age. For both male and female non-Western immigrants of all ages combined the numbers were 2.4% for the first generation and 4.54% for the second. The absolute crime rate had dropped by almost a half since the early twenty-first century, for both native Dutch and non-western immigrants. In 2017, a study concluded that asylum seekers in the Netherlands were less criminal than native Dutch with the same combination of age, gender and socio-economic position.

Norway

Spain

A 2008 study finds that the rates of crimes committed by immigrants are substantially higher than nationals. The study finds that "the arrival of immigrants has resulted in a lack of progress in the reduction of offences against property and in a minor increase in the number of offences against Collective Security (i.e. drugs and trafficking). In the case of nationals, their contribution to the increase in the crime rate is primarily concentrated in offences against persons." By controlling for socioeconomic and demographic factors, the gap between immigrants and natives is reduced but not fully. The authors also find "that a higher proportions of American, non-UE European, and African immigrants tend to widen the crime differential, the effect being larger for the latter ones". The same paper provides supports for the notion that labour market conditions impact the relationship between crime and immigration. Cultural differences were also statistically detected. This study has been criticized for not using strong instruments for identifying causality: the "instruments (lagged values of the covariates and measures of the service share of GDP in a province) are not convincing in dealing with the endogeneity of migrant location choice."

Spanish National Statistics Institute (INE) published a study that analyzes records in the Register of Convicted in 2008. The data show that immigrants are overrepresented in the crime statistics: 70% of all crimes were committed by Spaniards and 30% by foreigners. Foreigners make up 15% of the population.

Switzerland

In Switzerland, 69.7% of the prison population did not have Swiss citizenship, compared to 22.1% of total resident population (as of 2008).
The figure of arrests by residence status is not usually made public. In 1997, when there were for the first time more foreigners than Swiss among the convicts under criminal law (out of a fraction of 20.6% of the total population at the time), a special report was compiled by the Federal Department of Justice and Police (published in 2001) which for the year 1998 found an arrest rate per 1000 adult population of 2.3 for Swiss citizens, 4.2 for legally resident aliens and 32 for asylum seekers. 21% of arrests made concerned individuals with no residence status, who were thus either sans papiers or "crime tourists" without any permanent residence in Switzerland.

A 2019 study found that asylum seekers exposed to civil conflict and mass killing during childhood were 35% more prone to violent crimes than co-national asylum seekers who were not exposed to conflict. The conflict exposed cohorts have a higher propensity to target victims from their own nationality. Offering labor market access to the asylum seekers eliminates two-thirds of effect of conflict exposure on crime propensity.

In 2010, a statistic was published which listed delinquency by nationality (based on 2009 data).
To avoid distortions due to demographic structure, only the male population aged between 18 and 34 was considered for each group. From the study, it became clear that crime rate is highly correlated on the country of origin of the various migrant groups.
Thus, immigrants from Germany, France and Austria had a significantly lower crime rate than Swiss citizens (60% to 80%), while immigrants from Angola, Nigeria and Algeria had a crime rate of above 600% of that of Swiss population.
In between these extremes were immigrants from Former Yugoslavia, with crime rates of between 210% and 300% of the Swiss value.

Sweden

Those with immigrant background are over-represented in Swedish crime statistics, but research shows that socioeconomic factors, such as unemployment, poverty, exclusion language, and other skills explain most of difference in crime rates between immigrants and natives.

According to the vice National Police Commissioner of the Swedish Police Authority, intelligence gathered by police showed that there are about ethnic 40 crime clans in Sweden who came to the country in order to pursue organized crime. They are primarily settled in Stockholm, Södertälje, Gothenburg, Malmö, Landskrona and Jönköping. In these clans, the extended family raises the children to take over the organized crime activities and they have no ambitions to become integrated into Swedish mainstream society. Swedish prime minister Stefan Löfven had long denied that crime gangs had anything to do with immigration, but in September 2020 changed his stance in an SVT interview, where he said that a large immigration led to difficulties with integration which in turn increased risk of crime.

About one third of new prison inmates in the 2011-2019 did not have Swedish citizenship, where there was an increase in the share from 29% in 2011 to 33% in 2019.

A 2014 survey of several studies found that people with foreign background are, on average, two times more likely to commit crimes than those born in Sweden. This figure has remained stable since the 1970s, despite the changes in numbers of immigrants and their country of origin. Some studies reporting a link on immigration and crime have been criticized for not taking into account the population's age, employment and education level, all of which affect level of crime. In general, research that takes these factors into account does not support the idea that there is a link between immigration and crime.

Recent immigration to Sweden 
Crime and immigration was one of the major themes of the 2018 Swedish general election.

In 2018, Swedish Television investigative journalism show Uppdrag Granskning analysed the total of 843 district court cases from the five preceding years and found that 58% of all convicted of rape had a foreign background and 40% were born in the Middle East and Africa, with young men from Afghanistan numbering 45 stood out as being the most next most common country of birth after Sweden. When only analysing rape assault (Swedish: överfallsvåldtäkt) cases, that is cases where perpetrator and victim were not previously acquainted, 97 out of 129 were born outside Europe.

In a 2016 report on sexual harassment police found ten cases where groups of men (aged 25–30) or boys (aged 14–16) had surrounded a lone girl and sexually assaulted her while filming, along with groups of girls being subjected to the same experience. Only a few perpetrators were identified and all investigations in Stockholm and Kalmar involved suspects from Afghanistan and Eritrea.

Viral falsehoods have circulated in recent years that tie immigrants and refugees to an alleged surge of crime in Sweden. According to Jerzy Sarnecki, a criminologist at Stockholm University, "What we’re hearing is a very, very extreme exaggeration based on a few isolated events, and the claim that it’s related to immigration is more or less not true at all." A 2020 pan European comparative study conducted by the Swedish National Council for Crime Prevention showed that if reported and cleared rapes are measured in a comparable way, the number of rapes in Sweden are close to the European average. According to Klara Selin, a sociologist at the National Council for Crime Prevention, the major reasons why Sweden has a higher rate of rape than other countries is due to the way in which Sweden documents rape ("if a woman reports being raped multiple times by her husband that’s recorded as multiple rapes, for instance, not just one report") and a culture where women are encouraged to report rapes. Stina Holmberg at the National Council for Crime Prevention, noted that "there is no basis for drawing the conclusion that crime rates are soaring in Sweden and that that is related to immigration".

In 2017, FactCheck.Org noted that "experts said there is no evidence of a major crime wave." According to official statistics, the reported crime rate in Sweden has risen since 2005 whereas annual government surveys show that the number of Swedes experiencing crime remain steady since 2005, even as Sweden has taken in hundreds of thousands of immigrants and refugees over the same period. Jerzy Sarnecki, a criminologist at the University of Stockholm, said foreign-born residents are twice as likely to be registered for a crime as native Swedes but that other factors beyond place of birth are at play, such as education level and poverty, and that similar trends occur in European countries that have not taken in a lot of immigrants in recent years.

According to data gathered by Swedish police from October 2015 to January 2016, 5,000 police calls out of 537,466 involved asylum seekers and refugees. According to Felipe Estrada, professor of criminology at Stockholm University, this shows how the media gives disproportionate attention to and exaggerates the alleged criminal involvement of asylum seekers and refugees. Henrik Selin, head of the Department for Intercultural Dialogue at the Swedish Institute, noted that allegations of a surge in immigrant crime after the intake of more than 160,000 immigrants in 2015 have been “highly exaggerated... there is nothing to support the claim that the crime rate took off after the 160,000 came in 2015.” While it's true that immigrants have been over-represented among those committing crimes—particularly in some suburban communities heavily populated by immigrants, he said—the issue of crime and immigration is complex. Speaking in February 2017, Manne Gerell, a doctoral student in criminology at Malmö University, noted that while immigrants where disproportionately represented among crime suspects, many of the victims of immigrant crimes were other immigrants.

A Swedish Police report from May 2016 found that there have been 123 incidents of sexual molestation in the country's public baths and pools in 2015 (112 of them were directed against girls). In 55% of cases, the perpetrator could be reasonably identified. From these identified perpetrators, 80% were of foreign origin. The same report found 319 cases of sexual assault on public streets and parks in 2015. In these cases, only 17 suspected perpetrators have been identified, 4 of them Swedish nationals with the remainder being of foreign origin. Another 17 were arrested, but not identified.

In March 2018, newspaper Expressen investigated gang rape court cases from the two preceding years and found that there were 43 men having been convicted. Their average age was 21 and 13 were under the age of 18 when the crime was committed. Of the convicted, 40 out of the 43 were either immigrants (born abroad) or born in Sweden to immigrant parents. Another investigation by newspaper Aftonbladet found that of 112 men and boys convicted for gang rape since July 2012, 82 were born outside Europe. The median age of the victims was 15, while 7 out of 10 perpetrators were between 15 and 20. According to professor Christian Diesen, a foreigner may have a lower threshold to commit sexual assault due to having grown up in a misogynist culture where all women outside the home are interpreted as available. Also professor Henrik Tham stated that there was a clear over-representatation of foreigners and cultural differences, while also adding that few cultures allow such behaviour. Professor Jerzy Sarnecki instead emphasized socioeconomic factors and that police may be more diligient in investigating crimes by foreigners.

Past immigration to Sweden 
A 2005 study by the Swedish National Council for Crime Prevention found that people of foreign background were 2.5 times more likely to be suspected of crimes than people with a Swedish background, including immigrants being four times more likely to be suspected of for lethal violence and robbery, five times more likely to be investigated for sex crimes, and three times more likely to be investigated for violent assault. The report was based on statistics for those "suspected" of offences. The Council for Crime Prevention said that there was "little difference" in the statistics for those suspected of crimes and those actually convicted. A 2006 government report suggests that immigrants face discrimination by law enforcement, which could lead to meaningful differences between those suspected of crimes and those actually convicted. A 2008 report by the Swedish National Council for Crime Prevention finds evidence of discrimination towards individuals of foreign descent in the Swedish judicial system. The 2005 report finds that immigrants who entered Sweden during early childhood have lower crime rates than other immigrants. By taking account of socioeconomic factors (gender, age, education and income), the crime rate gap between immigrants and natives decreases.

A 2013 study done by Stockholm University showed that the 2005 study's difference was due to the socioeconomic differences (e.g. family income, growing up in a poor neighborhood) between people born in Sweden and those born abroad. The authors furthermore found "that culture is unlikely to be a strong cause of crime among immigrants".

A study published in 1997 attempted to explain the higher than average crime rates among immigrants to Sweden. It found that between 20 and 25 percent of asylum seekers to Sweden had experienced physical torture, and many suffered from post-traumatic stress disorder. Other refugees had witnessed a close relative being killed.

The 2005 study reported that persons from North Africa and Western Asia were over-represented in crime statistics, whereas a 1997 paper additionally found immigrants from Finland, South America, Arab world and Eastern Europe to be over-represented in crime statistics. Studies have found that native-born Swedes with high levels of unemployment are also over-represented in crime statistics.

A 1996 report by the Swedish National Council for Crime Prevention determined that between 1985 and 1989 individuals born in Iraq, North Africa (Algeria, Libya, Morocco and Tunisia), Africa (excluding Uganda and the North African countries), other Middle East (Jordan, Palestine, Syria), Iran and Eastern Europe (Romania, Bulgaria) were convicted of rape at rates 20, 23, 17, 9, 10 and 18 greater than individuals born in Sweden respectively. Both the 1996 and 2005 reports have been criticized for using insufficient controls for socioeconomic factors.

A 2013 study found that both first- and second-generation immigrants have a higher rate of suspected offenses than indigenous Swedes. While first-generation immigrants have the highest offender rate, the offenders have the lowest average number of offenses, which indicates that there is a high rate of low-rate offending (many suspected offenders with only one single registered offense). The rate of chronic offending (offenders suspected of several offenses) is higher among indigenous Swedes than first-generation immigrants. Second-generation immigrants have higher rates of chronic offending than first-generation immigrants but lower total offender rates.

Turkey
A study has shown that Syrian refugees have no significant effect on crime rates in Turkey. This debunks the perception by far-right Turkish activists who argued that most crimes are committed by Syrians, but figures show Syrians were perpetrators in less than 2% of crimes nationwide.

United Kingdom

Historically, Irish immigrants to the United Kingdom in the eighteenth and nineteenth centuries were considered over-represented amongst those appearing in court. Research suggests that policing strategy may have put immigrants at a disadvantage by targeting only the most public forms of crime, while locals were more likely able to engage in the types of crimes that could be conducted behind locked doors. An analysis of historical courtroom records suggests that despite higher rates of arrest, immigrants were not systematically disadvantaged by the British court system in the eighteenth and nineteenth centuries.

On 30 June 2022 there were 9,682 prisoners from 164 different countries in the jails of England and Wales. Albania, Poland and Romania formed the highest percentage of foreign nationals in UK prisons. In total, foreigners represented 12% of the prison population, whereas foreign nationals are 13% of the total population in England and Wales. During the 2000s, there was a 111% increase of foreign nationals in UK prisons. According to one study, "there is little evidence to support the theory that the foreign national prison population continues to grow because foreign nationals are more likely to commit crime than are British citizens or more likely to commit crime of a serious nature". The increase may partly be due to the disproportionate number of convicted for drug offences; crimes associated with illegal immigration (fraud and forgery of government documents, and immigration offenses); ineffective deportation provisions; and a lack of viable options to custody (which affects bail and sentencing decision making).

Research has found no evidence of an average causal impact of immigration on crime in the United Kingdom. One study based on evidence from England and Wales in the 2000s found no evidence of an average causal impact of immigration on crime in England and Wales. No causal impact and no immigrant differences in the likelihood of being arrested were found for London, which saw large immigration changes. A 2017 study offered qualified support for the notion that immigration had contributed to declining crime rates in the UK. A study of two large waves of immigration to the UK (the late 1990s/early 2000s asylum seekers and the post-2004 inflow from EU accession countries) found that the "first wave led to a modest but significant rise in property crime, while the second wave had a small negative impact. There was no effect on violent crime; arrest rates were not different, and changes in crime cannot be ascribed to crimes against immigrants. The findings are consistent with the notion that differences in labor market opportunities of different migrant groups shape their potential impact on crime." A 2013 study found "that crime is significantly lower in those neighborhoods with sizeable immigrant population shares" and that "the crime reducing effect is substantially enhanced if the enclave is composed of immigrants from the same ethnic background." A 2014 study of property crimes based on the Crime and Justice Survey (CJS) of 2003, (a national representative survey where respondents in England and Wales were asked questions regarding their criminal activities), after taking into account the under-reporting of crimes, even found that "immigrants who are located in London and black immigrants are significantly less criminally active than their native counterparts". Another 2014 study found that "areas that have witnessed the greatest percentage of recent immigrants arriving since 2004 have not witnessed higher levels of robbery, violence, or sex offending" but have "experienced higher levels of drug offenses."

It was reported in 2007 that more than one-fifth of solved crimes in London was committed by immigrants. Around a third of all solved, reported sex offences and a half of all solved, reported frauds in the capital were carried out by non-British citizens. A 2008 study found that the crime rate of Eastern European immigrants was the same as that of the indigenous population.

Americas

Canada 
A 2014 study found that immigration reduced the property crime rate in Canada: "new immigrants do not have a significant impact on property crime rates, but as they stay longer, more established immigrants actually decrease property crime rates significantly."

Chile 
A 2020 study found no relationship between immigration and crime in Chile.

United States

There is no empirical evidence that either legal or illegal immigration increase crime rates in the United States. Some research finds that immigration, both legal and illegal might actually reduce crime. A study conducted by Aaron Chalfin, of the American Economic Review journal, found that an increase in immigration in the 1990s saw a decline in US crime rates. It was largely attributed to a reluctance from immigrants to report crimes in fear that they would testify to police.

Early immigration 
One of the first political analyses in the U.S. of the relationship between immigration and crime was performed in the beginning of the 20th century by the Dillingham Commission. The Commission found a relationship especially for immigrants from non-Northern European countries, resulting in the sweeping 1920s immigration reduction acts, including the Emergency Quota Act of 1921 and Immigration Act of 1924, which favored immigration from Northern and Northwestern Europe over the supposedly criminally-inclined immigrants from Southern and Eastern Europe (i.e., mainly Italians, as well as certain Slavs and Jews from Eastern Europe). Recent research is skeptical of the conclusion drawn by the commission. One study finds that, "major government commissions on immigration and crime in the early twentieth century relied on evidence that suffered from aggregation bias and the absence of accurate population data, which led them to present partial and sometimes misleading views of the immigrant-native criminality comparison. With improved data and methods, we find that in 1904, prison commitment rates for more serious crimes were quite similar by nativity for all ages except ages 18 and 19, for which the commitment rate for immigrants was higher than for the native-born. By 1930, immigrants were less likely than natives to be committed to prisons at all ages 20 and older, but this advantage disappears when one looks at commitments for violent offenses."

For the early 20th century, one study found that immigrants had "quite similar" imprisonment rates for major crimes as natives in 1904 but lower for major crimes (except violent offenses; the rate was similar) in 1930. Contemporary commissions used dubious data and interpreted it in questionable ways. A study by Harvard economist Nathan Nunn, Yale economist Nancy Qian, and LSE economist Sandra Sequeira found that the 'Age of Mass Migration' (1850–1920) had no long-run effects on crime rates in the United States.

Figures gathered from the records of the Court of general sessions of the New York County in November 1909, showed that 35,8% of crime convictions in the years 1904-08 concerned foreign-born individuals; in comparison, at the time 43% of the City of New York's population was foreign-born. The demographics were broken down as following:

Recent immigration 
Most studies in the U.S. have found lower crime rates among immigrants than among non-immigrants, and that higher concentrations of immigrants are associated with lower crime rates. Likewise, a 2018 paper found no statistically significant evidence that refugees to the United States have an impact on crime rates. A separate 2018 paper by scholars at Stanford University's Immigration Policy Lab found that U.S. President Donald Trump's refugee ban (which caused a 66% reduction in refugee resettlement) had no impact on crime rates.

For men between the ages of 18 and 39, the demographic with the highest propensity for crime, the incarceration rate for immigrants is one-fourth that of native-born Americans. These findings contradict popular perceptions that immigration increases crime. Some research even suggests that increases in immigration may partly explain the reduction in the U.S. crime rate. A 2017 study suggests that immigration did not play a significant part in lowering the crime rate. A 2005 study showed that immigration to large U.S. metropolitan areas does not increase, and in some cases decreases, crime rates there. A 2009 study found that recent immigration was not associated with homicide in Austin, Texas. The low crime rates of immigrants to the United States despite having lower levels of education, lower levels of income and residing in urban areas (factors that should lead to higher crime rates) may be due to lower rates of antisocial behavior among immigrants. This phenomenon is known as the immigrant paradox, in which immigrants have better health and behavioral outcomes despite socio-economic disadvantage. A 2015 study estimated that Mexican immigration to metropolitan statistical areas significantly increased aggravated assaults and decreased rape, larceny and motor vehicle theft. Another 2015 study found no significant influence of rates of immigrant presence on homicide in cities. A 2016 study finds no link between immigrant populations and violent crime, although there is a small but significant association between undocumented immigrants and drug-related crime. A 2020 study found that native-born US citizens are incarcerated at higher rates for homicide in Texas than undocumented immigrants.

Multiple studies have found that undocumented immigration to the United States do not increase violent crime. A 2017 study found that "Increased undocumented immigration was significantly associated with reductions in drug arrests, drug overdose deaths, and DUI arrests, net of other factors." Research finds that Secure Communities, an immigration enforcement program that led to a quarter of a million of detentions, had no observable impact on the crime rate. A 2015 study found that the 1986 Immigration Reform and Control Act (IRCA), which legalized almost 3 million immigrants, led to "decreases in crime of 3–5 percent, primarily due to decline in property crimes, equivalent to 120,000–180,000 fewer violent and property crimes committed each year due to legalization." Research has found no statistically significant effect on crime for sanctuary cities—which adopt policies designed to not prosecute people solely for being an undocumented immigrant. A 2018 study in the American Economic Journal: Economic Policy found that by restricting the employment opportunities for unauthorized immigrants, IRCA likely caused an increase in crime.

There is evidence, however, that second-generation immigrants—that is, US-born children of immmigrants—are more crime-prone than their foreign-born parents.

Terrorism 
According to a review by The Washington Post fact-checker of the available research and evidence, there is nothing to support President Trump's claim that "the vast majority of individuals convicted of terrorism-related offenses since 9/11 came here from outside of our country." The fact-checker noted that the Government Accountability Office had found that "of the 85 violent extremist incidents that resulted in death since September 12, 2001, 73 percent (62) were committed by far-right-wing violent extremist groups, and 27 percent (23) by radical Islamist violent extremists." A bulletin by the FBI and Department of Homeland Security also warned in May 2017 that white supremacist groups were “responsible for a lion’s share of violent attacks among domestic extremist groups." According to a report by the New America foundation, of the individuals credibly involved in radical Islamist-inspired activity in the United States since 9/11, the large majority were US-born citizens, not immigrants.

A 2020 study found little evidence of a relationship between unauthorized immigration and terrorism. Studies have found that refugee settlements in the United States have no impact on terrorism or crime.

Oceania

Australia

A 2019 study found no impact of immigration on crime rates in Australia. Foreigners are under-represented in the Australian prison population, according to 2010 figures. A 1987 report by the Australian Institute of Criminology noted that studies had consistently found that migrant populations in Australia had lower crime rates than the Australian-born population.

The alleged link between immigration and criminality has been a longstanding meme in Australian history with many of the original immigrants being convicts. During the 1950s and 1960s, the majority of emigrants to the country arrived from Italy and Greece, and were shortly afterwards associated with local crime.  This culminated in the "Greek conspiracy case" of the 1970s, when Greek physicians were accused of defrauding the Medibank system. The police were later found to have conducted investigations improperly, and the doctors were eventually cleared of all charges. After the demise of the White Australia policy restricting non-European immigration, the first large settler communities from Asia emerged. This development was accompanied by a moral panic regarding a potential spike in criminal activity by the Triads and similar organizations. In 1978, the erstwhile weekly The National Times also reported on involvement in the local drug trade by Calabrian Italian, Turkish, Lebanese and Chinese dealers.

Discourse surrounding immigrant crime reached a head in the late 1990s. The fatal stabbing of a Korean teenager in Punchbowl in October 1998 followed by a drive-by shooting of the Lakemba police station prompted then New South Wales Premier Bob Carr and NSW Police Commissioner Peter Ryan to blame the incidents on Lebanese gangs. Spurred on by the War on Terror, immigrant identities became increasingly criminalized in the popular Sydney media. By the mid-2000s and the outbreak of the Cronulla riots, sensationalist broadcast and tabloid media representations had reinforced existing stereotypes of immigrant communities as criminal entities and ethnic enclaves as violent and dangerous areas.

The only reliable statistics on immigrant crime in Australia are based on imprisonment rates by place of birth. As of 1999, this data indicated that immigrants from Vietnam (2.7 per 1,000 of population), Lebanon (1.6) and New Zealand (1.6) were over-represented within the national criminal justice system. Compared to the Australian-born (1), immigrants from Italy (0.6), the United Kingdom (0.6), Ireland (0.6) and Greece (0.5) were under-represented.

Victoria Police said in 2012 that Sudanese immigrants around are five times more likely to commit crimes than other state residents. The rate of offending in the Sudanese community was 7109.1 per 100,000 individuals,  and 1301.0 per 100,000 for the wider Victoria community. Robbery and assault said to have been the most common types of crime committed by the Sudanese residents, with assault purported to represent 29.5% and 24.3% of all offences, respectively. The overall proportion of crime in the state said to have been committed by members of the Sudanese community was 0.92 percent.People born in Sudan are around 0.1percent, respectively, of Victoria's population. Journalist Dan Oakes, writing in The Age, noted that individuals arrested and charged might have been falsely claiming to belong to that community. In 2015, Sudanese-born youths were "vastly over-represented" in Victoria Police LEAP data, responsible for 7.44 per cent of alleged home invasions, 5.65 per cent of car thefts and 13.9 per cent of aggravated robberies. A similar overrepresentation occurs in Kenyan-born youths. In January 2018, Acting Chief Commissioner Shane Patton that there was an "issue with overrepresentation by African youth in serious and violent offending as well as public disorder issues".

In 2010, six applicants brought charges of impropriety against several members of the Victorian Police, the Chief Commissioner of Victoria Police, and the State of Victoria in the Melbourne areas of Flemington and Kensington. The ensuing Haile-Michael v Konstantinidis case alleged various forms of mistreatment by the public officials in violation of the Racial Discrimination Act 1975. In March 2012, an order of discovery was made, whereby established statistician Ian Gordon of the University of Melbourne independently analysed Victorian Police LEAP data from Flemington and North Melbourne (2005–2008). The report concluded that residents from Africa were two and a half times more likely to be subjected to an arbitrary "stop and search" than their representation in the population. Although the justification provided for such disproportionate policing measures was over-representation in local crime statistics, the study found that the same police LEAP data in reality showed that male immigrants from Africa on average committed substantially less crime than male immigrants from other backgrounds. Despite this, the latter alleged male offenders were observed to be 8.5 times more likely not to be the subject of a police "field contact". The case was eventually settled on 18 February 2013, with a landmark agreement that the Victoria Police would publicly review its "field contact" and training processes. The inquiry is expected to help police identify areas where discrimination in the criminal justice system has the potential to or does occur; implement institutional reforms as pre-emptive measures in terms of training, policy and practice; predicate changes on international law enforcement best practices; ammeliorate the local police's interactions with new immigrants and ethnic minorities, as well as with the Aboriginal community; and serve as a benchmark for proper conduct vis-a-vis other police departments throughout the country.

The Australian Bureau of Statistics regularly publishes characteristics of those incarcerated including country of birth. The 2014 figures show that in general native-born Australians, New Zealanders, Vietnamese, Lebanese, Sudanese, Iraqi and people from Fiji are responsible for higher share of crime than their share in the population (overrepresented), while people from the UK, the Chinese and people from Philippines are responsible for a lower share (underrepresented).

New Zealand 
Foreigners are under-represented in the New Zealand prison population, according to 2010 figures.

Perception of immigrant criminality 
Research suggests that people overestimate the relationship between immigration and criminality. A 2016 study of Belgium found that living in an ethnically diverse community led to a greater fear of crime, unrelated to the actual crime rate. A 2015 study found that the increase in immigration flows into western European countries that took place in the 2000s did "not affect crime victimization, but it is associated with an increase in the fear of crime, the latter being consistently and positively correlated with the natives’ unfavourable attitude toward immigrants." Americans dramatically overestimate the relationship between refugees and terrorism. A 2018 study found that media coverage of immigrants in the United States has a general tendency to emphasize illegality and/or criminal behavior in a way that is inconsistent with actual immigrant demographics.

Political consequences 
Research suggests that the perception that there is a positive causal link between immigration and crime leads to greater support for anti-immigration policies or parties. Research also suggests a vicious cycle of bigotry and immigrant alienation could exacerbate immigrant criminality and bigotry. For instance, UC San Diego political scientist Claire Adida, Stanford University political scientist David Laitin, and Sorbonne University economist Marie-Anne Valfort argue: [F]ear-based policies that target groups of people according to their religion or region of origin are counter-productive. Our own research, which explains the failed integration of Muslim immigrants in France, suggests that such policies can feed into a vicious cycle that damages national security. French Islamophobia—a response to cultural difference—has encouraged Muslim immigrants to withdraw from French society, which then feeds back into French Islamophobia, thus further exacerbating Muslims’ alienation, and so on. Indeed, the failure of French security in 2015 was likely due to police tactics that intimidated rather than welcomed the children of immigrants—an approach that makes it hard to obtain crucial information from community members about potential threats.A study of the long-run effects of the 9/11 terrorist attacks found that the post-9/11 increase in hate crimes against Muslims decreased assimilation by Muslim immigrants. Controlling for relevant factors, the authors found that "Muslim immigrants living in states with the sharpest increase in hate crimes also exhibit: greater chances of marrying within their own ethnic group; higher fertility; lower female labour force participation; and lower English proficiency."

States that experience terrorist acts on their own soil or against their own citizens are more likely to adopt stricter restrictions on asylum recognition. Individuals who believe that African Americans and Hispanics are more prone to violence are more likely to support capital punishment.

The Dillingham Commission singled out immigrants from Southern Europe for their involvement in violent crime (even though the data did not support its conclusions). The commission's overall findings provided the rationale for sweeping 1920s immigration-reduction acts, including the Emergency Quota Act of 1921, which favored immigration from northern and western Europe by restricting the annual number of immigrants from any given country to 3 percent of the total number of people from that country living in the United States in 1910.  The movement for immigration restriction that the Dillingham Commission helped to stimulate culminated in the National Origins Formula, part of the Immigration Act of 1924, which capped national immigration at 150,000 annually and completely barred immigration from Asia.

See also 
 Opposition to immigration
 Race and crime
 Youth bulge

References

Further reading

 Adelman, Robert, Lesley Williams Reid, Gail Markle, Saskia Weiss, and Charles Jaret. 2017. "Urban crime rates and the changing face of immigration: Evidence across four decades." Journal of Ethnicity in Criminal Justice 15(1): 52–77. . .
Bersani, Bianca E. 2014. "An Examination of First and Second Generation Immigrant Offending Trajectories." Justice Quarterly 31(2):315–43. . .
Butcher, Kristin F., and Anne Morrison Piehl. 1998. "Cross-city evidence on the relationship between immigration and crime." Journal of Policy Analysis and Management 17(3):457–93. 
Davies, Garth, and Jeffrey Fagan. 2012. "Crime and Enforcement in Immigrant Neighborhoods Evidence from New York City." The Annals of the American Academy of Political and Social Science 641(1):99–124. . .
Lee, Matthew T., Ramiro Martinez, and Richard Rosenfeld. 2001. "Does Immigration Increase Homicide?" Sociological Quarterly 42(4):559–80. . .
Light, Michael T., and Jeffery T. Ulmer. 2016. "Explaining the Gaps in White, Black, and Hispanic Violence since 1990 Accounting for Immigration, Incarceration, and Inequality." American Sociological Review 81(2):290–315. . .
Martinez, Ramiro, Matthew T. Lee, and Amie L. Nielsen. 2004. "Segmented Assimilation, Local Context and Determinants of Drug Violence in Miami and San Diego: Does Ethnicity and Immigration Matter?" International Migration Review 38(1):131–57. . .
Martinez Jr, Ramiro, Jacob I. Stowell, and Janice A. Iwama. 2016. "The Role of Immigration: Race/Ethnicity and San Diego Homicides Since 1970." Journal of Quantitative Criminology 32(3):471–88. . .
Martínez, Ramiro, and Abel Valenzuela, eds. 2006. Immigration and Crime: Race, Ethnicity, and Violence. New York University Press.
Ousey, Graham C., and Charis E. Kubrin. 2013. "Immigration and the Changing Nature of Homicide in US Cities, 1980–2010." Journal of Quantitative Criminology 30(3):453–83. . .
Reid, Lesley Williams, Harald E. Weiss, Robert M. Adelman, and Charles Jaret. 2005. "The immigration–crime relationship: Evidence across US metropolitan areas." Social Science Research 34(4):757–80. .
Vaughn, Michael G., and Christopher P. Salas-Wright. 2018. "Immigrants commit crime and violence at lower rates than the US-born Americans." Annals of Epidemiology 28(1):58–60.e1. . .
Wolff, Kevin T., Michael T. Baglivio, Jonathan Intravia, and Alex R. Piquero. 2015. "The protective impact of immigrant concentration on juvenile recidivism: A statewide analysis of youth offenders." Journal of Criminal Justice 43(6):522–31. .

Tropes
Immigration
Crime
Migration studies